Hypopyra feniseca is a moth of the family Erebidae. It is found in China, India (West Bengal), Bangladesh, Nepal, Thailand and Vietnam.

References

Moths described in 1852
Hypopyra
Moths of Asia
Taxa named by Achille Guenée